The 2003 Skate America was the first event of six in the 2003–04 ISU Grand Prix of Figure Skating. It was held at the Sovereign Center in Reading, Pennsylvania on October 23–26. Medals were awarded in the disciplines of men's singles, ladies' singles, pair skating, and ice dancing. Skaters earned points toward qualifying for the 2003–04 Grand Prix Final. The compulsory dance was the Austrian Waltz.

This was the first Grand Prix event to use the New Judging System.

Results

Men

Ladies

Pairs

Ice dancing

External links
 

Skate America, 2003
Skate America